Aero Fiesta Mexicana (official legal name Interamericana, S.A. de C.V.) was a Mexican airline company. It began as "InterAmérica", and later changed names. It operated during the 1990s.

Fleet
1 Boeing 737-275

References

Defunct airlines of Mexico
Airlines established in 1993
Airlines disestablished in 1994
1993 establishments in Mexico